Patricia Clarke may refer to:

Patricia H. Clarke (1919–2010), British biochemist
Patricia Clarke (historian) (born 1926), Australian historian and author